The 2021 WNBL–Philippines draft was the league's draft for the 2021 WNBL–Philippines season which is also the first season of the WNBL as a professional league. It is the first ever draft of the league. Delayed by restrictions related to the COVID-19 pandemic, the draft was held on February 13, 2021.

Fille Claudine Cainglet by the Glutagence Glow Boosters was the first overall pick of the draft.

Combine
The draft combine was held from December 12 to 13, 2020 at the Victoria Sports Tower in Quezon City with 148 participants. It was earlier supposed to be held from October 12 to 16 in Pampanga under a "bubble" setup as part of precautionary measures related to the COVID-19 pandemic.

Draft lottery
The draft lottery was scheduled be held on October 18, 2020. However the draft lottery was delayed and was held on February 7, 2021 as an online event. The draft order per team varied depending on various factors including the number of "protected" players per team. The Glutagence Glow Boosters made the first pick for the first round since they had the fewest protected players at three, all of which took part in the inaugural 2019 WNBL season. Not all teams got to make their pick in every round and the completion of documentary requirements influenced the draft order for a certain round. Two teams would potentially join the league between the draft lottery and the draft proper, and their draft order would likewise be influenced by the number of their protected players. However these teams, later announced to be the Taguig Lady Generals and Zele Wellness Center, were not able to join in time for the draft.

Eligibility
Entrants had to apply in order to be eligible for the draft. Initially the WNBL set September 30 as the deadline for prospect players to apply for the draft but the league moved the deadline earlier to September 22 due to the sheer number of applicants. At least 683 players applied for the draft.

The eligibility criteria were as follows:

Be 21 to 40 years of age
Be Filipino and born in the Philippines

Prior to the 2021 season, players of the WNBL had to be 18 to 35 years old. The age requirement was changed to allow older players to play in the league. The age eligibility for prospects above age 40 may be waived if they are deemed competitive enough to play. The league is open to "homegrown" Filipino players which meant players born anywhere in the Philippines and does not exclude players who lived abroad. Collegiate players are not prohibited from joining the draft but are encouraged to graduate first before entering future drafts to avoid complications with their mother collegiate leagues.

Players of the Philippine Navy Lady Sailors – Go For Gold were excluded from the draft since all of them are also enlisted military personnel. This would apply to a team of the Philippine Army had they also joined the 2021 season.

115 players were eligible for selection in the draft.

Protected players
Each team could classify up to seven players as "protected" which would allow them to directly hire a player into their lineup.

Players

By number of players

Draft selections

Round 1

Round 2

Round 3

Round 4

Round 5

Round 6

Round 7

Round 8

Round 9

Round 10

Round 11

Round 12

Source: Tiebreaker Times/NBL-Philippines

References

WNBL–Philippines draft, 2020
WNBL
WNBL-Philippines draft
Women's National Basketball League (Philippines)
WNBL–Philippines draft